The Capri 25 is an American trailerable sailboat that was designed by Frank Butler as a one design racer and first built in 1980.

The design is sometimes confused with the Catalina 25, an unrelated 1978 design from the same manufacturer.

Production
The design was built by Catalina Yachts in the United States between 1980 and 1986, but it is now out of production.

Design
The Capri 25 is a recreational keelboat, built predominantly of fiberglass. It has a masthead sloop rig, a spooned raked stem, a vertical transom, an internally mounted spade-type rudder controlled by a tiller and a fixed fin keel. It displaces  and carries  of lead ballast.

The boat is normally fitted with a small  outboard motor for docking and maneuvering.

Accommodations consist of a bow "V"-berth, with two more settee berths in the main cabin. The galley consists of a sink and an ice box located under the companionway ladder. The head is a chemical type and located under the "V"-berth in the bow.

The cockpit is split, with the mainsheet traveler just ahead of the tiller. There are two jib winches mounted on the cockpit sides and two further winches on the cabin top for the halyards. A spinnaker is used for racing.

Operational history
In a 2010 review Steve Henkel wrote, "The Capri 25 (by Catalina) is nothing like a Catalina 25 ... The Capri is five inches shorter on deck, three feet shorter on the waterline, and weighs almost 1,400 pounds less than the Catalina, so we suppose you could call her a Catalina "Lite," especially since her towing weight is over a ton less, so you can use a smaller, lighter towing vehicle on the highway. Besides her lower weight, she has slightly more sail area and a sleeker fin keel, so she is also faster—way faster. In fact, her average PHRF rating is 171, which is, amazingly, 3 seconds per mile less than the legendary J/24, and a whopping 54 seconds less than the Catalina 25. Needless to say, part of her weight loss is accomplished by the omission of cabin furniture and other niceties like the Catalina's on-deck anchor locker. Other weight saving is achieved by eliminating 600 pounds of ballast, and by using a then-new material, Coremat, to replace some of the hull and deck laminate. Best features: If you like round-the-buoys racing and/or socializing in a one-design fleet, this may be the boat for you. She has a bit more space below than a J/24, and six inches more headroom, but otherwise her character is in the same range. Worst features: Nothing significant noticed."

Ben Towery, described buying and racing a Capri 25 in Utah for Sailing World in 2019, calling it "a sleek 1980s design, a decent interior and a wide deck".

See also
List of sailing boat types

Similar sailboats
Beachcomber 25
Bayfield 25
Beneteau First 25.7
Beneteau First 25S
Beneteau First 260 Spirit
Bombardier 7.6
C&C 25
C&C 25 Redline
Cal 25
Cal 2-25
Catalina 25
Catalina 250
Com-Pac 25
Dufour 1800
Hunter 25
Hunter 25.5
Kelt 7.6
Kirby 25
MacGregor 25
Merit 25
Mirage 25
Northern 25
O'Day 25
Sirius 26
Tanzer 25
US Yachts US 25
Watkins 25

References

Keelboats
1980s sailboat type designs
Sailing yachts
Sailboat type designs by Frank Butler
Sailboat types built by Catalina Yachts